Barbados is an island country in the Lesser Antilles of the West Indies, in the Caribbean region of North America. Barbados is outside the principal Atlantic hurricane belt. Its capital and largest city is Bridgetown.

Atlantic Ocean
The following rivers in Barbados flow to the Atlantic Ocean.
 Bruce Vale River, mouth: Saint Andrew Parish, 
 Joes River, mouth Saint Joseph Parish, 
 Long Pond River, mouth: Saint Andrew,

Caribbean Sea
The following rivers in Barbados flow to the Caribbean Sea.
 Constitution River, mouth: Saint Michael Parish, 
 Indian River, mouth: Saint Michael,

See also
List of rivers of the Americas by coastline

References

 
Barbados
Rivers
Barb